The Naetrocymbaceae are a family of fungi with an uncertain taxonomic placement in the class Dothideomycetes.

References

Pleosporales
Ascomycota families